Faujasia is a genus of flowering plants in the daisy family, native to certain islands in the Indian Ocean.

 Species
 Faujasia cadetiana C.Jeffrey	- Réunion
 Faujasia flexuosa (Lam.) Benth. & Hook.f. ex Hook.f. & B.D.Jacks. - Mauritius
 Faujasia pinifolia (Bory) Cass. - Réunion
 Faujasia salicifolia (Pers.) C.Jeffrey - Réunion
 Faujasia squamosa (Bory) C.Jeffrey - Réunion

 formerly included
now in other genera: Faujasiopsis Hubertia Parafaujasia 
 Faujasia ambavilloides Cordem. - syn of Hubertia multifoliosa (Klatt) C.Jeffrey
 Faujasia flexuosa (Lam.) Baker - syn of Faujasiopsis flexuosa (Lam.) C.Jeffrey
 Faujasia fontinalis Cordem. - syn of Parafaujasia fontinalis (Cordem.) C.Jeffrey
 Faujasia reticulata (Vahl) Baker - syn of Faujasiopsis reticulata (Vahl) C.Jeffrey

References

Asteraceae genera
Senecioneae